San Martín de Trevejo is a municipality (municipio) located in the province of Cáceres, Extremadura, Spain. According to the 2008 census (INE), the municipality has  inhabitants.

The local linguistic variety is the Fala language, different from both Spanish and Portuguese, but closer to the second.

See also 
 Jálama

References

External links
 A night walk

Municipalities in the Province of Cáceres